Chris Perry may refer to:
Chris Perry (musician) (1928–2002), Goan (Indian) composer and songwriter
Chris Perry (American wrestler) (born 1990), Oklahoma State assistant coach
Chris Perry (American football) (born 1982), American football player
Chris Perry (golfer) (born 1961), American golfer
Chris Perry (English footballer) (born 1973), English association football player
Chris Perry (Australian footballer) (born 1958), Australian rules footballer
Christopher Raymond Perry (1761–1818), American naval officer
Christopher J. Perry, publisher of the Philadelphia Tribune

See also
Christina Perri (born 1986), American singer